The C-82 Packet is a twin-engine, twin-boom cargo aircraft designed and built by Fairchild Aircraft. It was used briefly by the United States Army Air Forces and the successor United States Air Force following World War II.

Design and development 
Developed by Fairchild, the C-82 was intended as a heavy-lift cargo aircraft to succeed prewar civilian designs like the Curtiss C-46 Commando and Douglas C-47 Dakota using non-critical materials in its construction, primarily plywood and steel, so as not to compete with the production of combat aircraft. However, by early 1943 changes in specifications resulted in plans for an all-metal aircraft. The aircraft was designed for a number of roles, including cargo carrier, troop transport, parachute drop, medical evacuation, and glider towing. It featured a rear-loading ramp with wide doors and an empennage set 14 feet (4.3 m) off the ground that permitted trucks and trailers to back up to the doors without obstruction. The single prototype first flew on 10 September 1944. The aircraft were built at the Fairchild factory in Hagerstown, Maryland, with deliveries beginning in 1945 and ending in September 1948.

Problems surfaced almost immediately, as the aircraft was found to be underpowered and its airframe inadequate for the heavy lifting it was intended to perform. As a result, the Air Force turned to Fairchild for a solution to the C-82's shortcomings. A redesign was quickly performed under the designation XC-82B, which would overcome all of the C-82A's initial problems.

Operational history 

First flown in 1944, the first delivery was not until June 1945 and only a few entered service before the end of the war. In the end, only 223 C-82As would be built, a small number for a wartime production cargo aircraft. Most were used for cargo and troop transport, although a few were used for paratroop operations or towing military gliders. A redesign of the XC-82B would result in the production of the Fairchild C-119 Flying Boxcar.

In 1946, the United States Postal Service explored the concept of flying post offices using highly modified C-82s, which would operate similarly to those on trains where mail would be sorted by clerks and put in bags and then transferred to trucks on landing.

In 1948, a C-82 was fitted with track-gear landing gear, similar to the tracks on a crawler tractor, that allowed landings on unpaved, primitive runways.

During the Berlin Blockade, five C-82 aircraft carried large disassembled earthmoving equipment into the city to enable the construction of Berlin Tegel Airport in the fall of 1948.

Though relatively unsuccessful, the C-82A is best considered as an early development stage of the much more successful C-119B Flying Boxcar. The C-82A saw limited production before being replaced by the Flying Boxcar.

The C-82 was retired from the United States Air Force inventory in 1954.

Civil airline operations 
After the C-82A became surplus to United States Air Force requirements, small numbers were sold to civilian operators in Brazil, Chile, Mexico and the United States and these were utilized for many years as rugged freight aircraft, capable of carrying bulky items of cargo. The last example was retired in the late 1980s.

Variants 
XC-82
Prototype, one built.

C-82A Packet
Initial production version, 220 built.

EC-82A
 1948, fitted with Firestone-designed tracked landing gear. 13 aircraft allocated for conversion from C-82A, but only one completed .

XC-82B
 1947, fitted with 2650hp Pratt & Whitney R-4360 Wasp Major radial engines as a precursor to the C-119 series. One converted from a C-82A.

C-82N
 1946, Production aircraft built by North American Aviation. Only three were completed, before the remaining 997 were cancelled.

Steward-Davis Jet-Packet 1600
 1956, civil conversion of Fairchild C-82A with  Westinghouse J30-W turbojet booster engine in pod above upper fuselage. At least three converted.

Steward-Davis Jet-Packet 3200
Conversion of Jet-Packet 1600 with two J30-W engines in above-fuselage pod. One converted in 1957.

Jet-Packet 3400
 Jet-Packet with a  Westinghouse J34-WE-34, or  Westinghouse J34-WE-36 booster engine. At least four converted from 1962.

Steward-Davis Jet-Packet II
 Airframe weight reduction program to increase cargo weights and increased power from Pratt & Whitney R-2800CB-16 engines. Application applied to at least three Jet-Packet 1600s or 3400s, including the TWA C-82A Ontos.

Steward-Davis Skytruck I
 1964, C-82A aircraft with  takeoff weight, improved performance and a hot-air de-icing system, one converted. The Skytruck brand-name was allegedly the inspiration for Elleston Trevor's Skytruck in the 1964 novel, The Flight of the Phoenix.

Steward-Davis Skypallet
 1965 A C-82A redesign with the fuselage floor separating from the aircraft from nose to tail for large cargoes and the installation of an internal hoist. Only one aircraft was converted.

Operators 
 
Brazilian Air Force — the Primeiro Grupo de Transporte de Tropa (1st Troop Transport Group) operated C-82s of 1956-1969
 Serviços Aéreos Cruzeiro do Sul
 
 Linea Aerea Taxpa Ltda

 Honduran Air Force
 
 Compania Mexicana de Aviacion (CMA)
 
 Interior Airways
 Trans World Airlines — Used for transporting replacement engines
 United States Army Air Forces

Surviving aircraft 

Brazil
 45-57783 — C-82A stored at Eduardo Gomes International Airport in Manaus. The aircraft is in poor condition.
 48-0585 — C-82A stored at the Museu Aeroespacial at Campo dos Afonsos in Rio de Janeiro. It is an ex-Brazilian Air Force aircraft.

United States
 44-22991 — C-82A fuselage only in storage in the Walter Soplata Collection in Newbury Center, Ohio.
 44-23006 — C-82A on static display at the Pima Air & Space Museum in Tucson, Arizona.
 45-57814 — C-82A on static display at the Hagerstown Aviation Museum in Hagerstown, Maryland. The aircraft was flown to the airport on 15 October 2006, marking the world's last flight of a C-82.
 48-0574 — C-82A on static display at the McChord Air Museum at McChord Field in Tacoma, Washington.
 48-0581 — C-82A on static display at the National Museum of the United States Air Force at Wright-Patterson Air Force Base near Dayton, Ohio.

Specifications (C-82A)

Popular culture 

The C-82 is perhaps best known for its role in the 1964 novel, The Flight of the Phoenix, and Robert Aldrich's original 1965 film version. Based on the novel by Elleston Trevor, the story features a C-82A Packet operated by the fictional Arabco Oil Company. It crashes in the Libyan desert, and is rebuilt by the passengers and crew, using one tail boom, and is then flown to safety. Such an aircraft was made for the movie, the Tallmantz Phoenix P-1. It was certified airworthy by the Federal Aviation Administration. Paul Mantz, possibly the greatest Hollywood stunt pilot in history with 25,000 flight hours, was killed with the cameras rolling when he bounced the skids of the craft down too hard in a touch-and-go, buckling and breaking the fuselage behind the wing, sending the craft nose-down hard into the desert, tumbling it completely over at 90 mph. Mantz was killed instantly.

Minor league baseball namesake 
In 1953, the local minor league baseball team in Hagerstown, Maryland, was the Hagerstown Braves, so called because they were a minor league affiliate of the major league Milwaukee Braves. The Hagerstown team switched affiliation to the Washington Senators for the 1954 season. Instead of using the major league nickname, they chose the name Hagerstown Packets in tribute to the C-82. The Hagerstown Packets played in the Piedmont League during the 1954 and 1955 seasons.

See also

References 
Notes

Bibliography

 Bridgman, Leonard. Jane's All the World's Aircraft 1948. London: Sampson Low, Marston & Company, Ltd.
 Lloyd, Alwyn T. Fairchild C-82 Packet and C-119 Flying Boxcar. Hinckley, UK: Aerofax, 2005. 
 Swanborough, F.G. and Peter M. Bowers. United States Military Aircraft since 1909. London: Putnam, first edition, 1963.

External links 

"Super Size Freighter Resembles P-38 Fighter", Popular Mechanics, March 1944; first illustration of C-82 released to public — bottom half of p. 16
C-82 packet

Fairchild C-082 Packet
C-082
Twin-boom aircraft
High-wing aircraft
Hagerstown, Maryland
Aircraft first flown in 1944
Twin piston-engined tractor aircraft